Karpovo is a rural locality (a village) in Lavrovskoye Rural Settlement, Sudogodsky District, Vladimir Oblast, Russia. The population was 1 as of 2010,  and the district had three streets.

Geography 
Karpovo is located on the Voyninga River, 18 km north of Sudogda (the district's administrative centre) by road. Aksenovo is the nearest rural locality.

References 

Rural localities in Sudogodsky District